Kurowo may refer to the following places:
Kurowo, Grodzisk Wielkopolski County in Greater Poland Voivodeship (west-central Poland)
Kurowo, Przasnysz County in Masovian Voivodeship (east-central Poland)
Kurowo, Sierpc County in Masovian Voivodeship (east-central Poland)
Kurowo, Kościan County in Greater Poland Voivodeship (west-central Poland)
Kurowo, Podlaskie Voivodeship (north-east Poland)
Kurowo, Pomeranian Voivodeship (north Poland)
Kurowo railway station, a disused station in Kurowo, Pomeranian Voivodeship
Kurowo, West Pomeranian Voivodeship (north-west Poland)